The 13th Korea Drama Awards is an awards ceremony for excellence in television in South Korea. It was held on October 8, 2022 after a break of 2 years.

Nominations and winners
The ceremony was held in Gyeongnam Culture and Arts Center on October 8, 2022.

References

External links 
  

2022 television awards
 13
2022 in South Korea